Mucilaginibacter oryzae is a Gram-negative and non-spore-forming bacterium from the genus of Mucilaginibacter which has been isolated from rhizosphere soil from a rice plant (Oryza sativa) in Jinju in Korea.

References

External links
Type strain of Mucilaginibacter oryzae at BacDive -  the Bacterial Diversity Metadatabase	

Sphingobacteriia
Bacteria described in 2009